Fort Lee, in Prince George County, Virginia, United States, is a United States Army post and headquarters of the United States Army Combined Arms Support Command (CASCOM)/ Sustainment Center of Excellence (SCoE), the U.S. Army Quartermaster School, the U.S. Army Ordnance School, the U.S. Army Transportation School, the Army Logistics University (ALU), Defense Contract Management Agency (DCMA), and the U.S. Defense Commissary Agency (DeCA).

Fort Lee also hosts two Army museums, the U.S. Army Quartermaster Museum and the U.S. Army Women's Museum. The equipment and other materiel associated with the Army's Ordnance Museum was moved to Fort Lee in 2009–2010 for use by the United States Army Ordnance Training and Heritage Center.

The installation is named for U.S. Army Colonel and Confederate States General in Chief, Robert E. Lee. It is one of the U.S. Army installations named for Confederate soldiers that The Naming Commission is recommending be renamed. On August 8, 2022, the commission proposed the name be changed to Fort Gregg-Adams, after Lieutenant General Arthur J. Gregg and Lieutenant Colonel Charity Adams Earley.   On October 6, 2022 Secretary of Defense Lloyd Austin accepted the recommendation and directed the name change occur no later than January 1, 2024. On 5 January 2023 William A. LaPlante, US under-secretary of defense for acquisition and sustainment (USD (A&S)) directed the full implementation of the recommendations of the Naming Commission, DoD-wide.

Fort Lee is a census-designated place (CDP) with a population of 9,874 as of the 2020 census – nearly triple the size of the 2010 census count.

History

Civil War
At the start of the Civil War, a training camp was established west of Richmond (currently the area behind the Science Museum of Virginia) and was known as "Camp Lee" after the Confederate general. This military camp is unrelated to the latter Camp Lee.

World War I

Just 18 days after a state of war with Germany was declared, the first Camp Lee was selected as a state mobilization camp and later became a division training camp.

In June 1917, building began and within sixty days some 14,000 men were on the installation. The post was home to the 155th Depot Brigade. The role of depot brigades was to receive recruits and draftees, then organize them and provide them with uniforms, equipment and initial military training. Depot brigades also received soldiers returning home at the end of the war and carried out their mustering out and discharges.

When construction work ended, there were accommodations for 60,335 men. On 15 July 1917, the War Department announced that the camp would be named after Colonel Robert E. Lee, a US Army Colonel who later served in the Confederacy during the Civil War. In 2015 Brigadier General Malcolm Frost said, "Every Army installation is named for a soldier who holds a place in our military history." He further explained that the historic names chosen "represent individuals, not causes or ideologies," and that it was done "in the spirit of reconciliation, not division."

After World War I, Camp Lee was taken over by the Commonwealth of Virginia and designated a game preserve. Later, portions of the land were incorporated into the Petersburg National Battlefield and the Federal Correctional Institution, Petersburg.

In 1920 Camp Lee was still active, as the US 1920 Census showed many soldiers still stationed there.

World War II
In October 1940, the War Department ordered the construction of another Camp Lee on the site of the earlier installation. Built as rapidly as the first, construction was still ongoing when the Quartermaster Replacement Training Center (QMRTC) started operation in February 1941. Their number grew to 25,000 in 1942, and peaked at 35,000 in 1944.

Camp Lee was also the home of a Medical Replacement Training Center (MRTC), but as the Quartermaster training increased, it was decided to relocate the MRTC to Camp Pickett.

Later, the QMRTC was re-designated as an Army Services Forces Training Center, but it retained its basic mission of training Quartermaster personnel.

While the QMRTC was getting underway, the Quartermaster School was transferred to Camp Lee. A full program of courses was conducted, including Officer Candidate School. By the end of 1941, Camp Lee was the center of both basic and advanced training of Quartermaster personnel and held this position throughout the war.

Camp Lee to Fort Lee
When World War II ended, the fate of Camp Lee was in question. In 1946, the War Department announced that Camp Lee would be retained as a center for Quartermaster training. Official recognition of its permanent status was obtained in 1950 and the post was redesignated as Fort Lee.

Immediately troops began Quartermaster training for the Korean War and continued for the next three years. Fort Lee also had a Women's Army Corps (WAC) training center. After the Korean War, progress was made on an ambitious permanent building program.

Under the twenty-year program, Fort Lee changed from an installation of temporary wooden structures to a modern Army post with permanent brick and cinder block buildings.

The Quartermaster Training Center, created to supervise the training of Quartermaster personnel and troop units, brought an intensification of training activity within the Quartermaster Corps. As a result, the courses formerly taught at other locations were incorporated in the curriculum of the Quartermaster School.

Profound changes were evident at Fort Lee during 1962. The post became a Class 1 military installation under Second United States Army. The Quartermaster School became a part of the Continental Army Command service school system and was also selected to serve as the home of the Quartermaster Corps and Corps Historian. The Second United States Army was inactivated at Fort Lee in 1966 until its reactivation at Fort Gillem, Georgia in 1983.

In July 1973, Fort Lee came under the control of Training and Doctrine Command.

Fort Lee is the country's first army post to host a 'full-size' statue commemorating the service of women in the Army. The statue was unveiled in 2013.

In 2005 a Base Realignment and Closure (BRAC) law was passed by Congress. One of BRAC's requirements was the relocation of the United States Army Ordnance Center and School headquarters, the Ordnance Mechanical Maintenance School, the United States Army Ordnance Munitions and Electronic Maintenance School, and the Ordnance Museum to Fort Lee by the end 2011. The transfer of artifacts from Aberdeen to Fort Lee began in August 2009, with the former museum now designated the U.S. Army Ordnance Training and Heritage Center at Fort Lee.

Geography
According to the United States Census Bureau, the CDP has a total area of 8.4 square miles (21.6 km2), all of it land.

Demographics

As of the census of 2000, there were 7,269 people, 1,401 households, and 1,223 families residing in the CDP. The population density was 870.2 people per square mile (336.1/km2). There were 1,445 housing units at an average density of 173.0/sq mi (66.8/km2). The racial makeup of the CDP was 47.1% African American, 39.5% White, 0.7% Native American, 2.3% Asian, 0.4% Pacific Islander, 6.7% from other races, and 3.4% from two or more races. Hispanic or Latino of any race were 11.4% of the population.

There were 1,401 households, out of which 72.8% had children under the age of 18 living with them, 70.0% were married couples living together, 14.3% had a female householder with no husband present, and 12.7% were non-families. 11.4% of all households were made up of individuals, and 0.1% had someone living alone who was 65 years of age or older. The average household size was 3.27 and the average family size was 3.53.

In the CDP the population was spread out, with 27.9% under the age of 18, 34.0% from 18 to 24, 35.8% from 25 to 44, 2.1% from 45 to 64, and 0.2% who were 65 years of age or older. The median age was 22 years. For every 100 females there were 132.2 males. For every 100 females age 18 and over, there were 143.3 males.

The median income for a household in the CDP was $36,325, and the median income for a family was $40,197. Males had a median income of $27,511 versus $19,459 for females. The per capita income for the CDP was $12,448. About 6.3% of families and 7.6% of the population were below the poverty line, including 8.8% of those under age 18 and none of those age 65 or over.

Current units
 Kenner Army Health Clinic
 54th Quartermaster Company MA
 111th Quartermaster Company MA
 94th Training Division
 345th Training Squadron (USAF)

Climate
The climate in this area is characterized by hot, humid summers and generally mild to cool winters.  According to the Köppen Climate Classification system, Fort Lee has a humid subtropical climate, abbreviated "Cfa" on climate maps.

References

External links

 Fort Lee Traveller (military-authorized newspaper)
 Fort Lee (official site)
 U.S. Army Quartermaster Museum  (official site)
 

1917 establishments in Virginia
Census-designated places in Prince George County, Virginia
Lee
United States Army logistics installations
Training installations of the United States Army
Lee
Military installations established in 1917